The great white shark (Carcharodon carcharias), also known as the white shark, white pointer, or simply great white, is a species of large mackerel shark which can be found in the coastal surface waters of all the major oceans. However, most are smaller; males measure , and females measure  on average. According to a 2014 study, the lifespan of great white sharks is estimated to be as long as 70 years or more, well above previous estimates, making it one of the longest lived cartilaginous fishes currently known. According to the same study, male great white sharks take 26 years to reach sexual maturity, while the females take 33 years to be ready to produce offspring.

The great white shark is an apex predator, as it has no known natural predators other than, on very rare occasions, the orca. It is arguably the world's largest-known extant macropredatory fish, and is one of the primary predators of marine mammals, up to the size of large baleen whales. This shark is also known to prey upon a variety of other marine animals, including fish, and seabirds. It is the only known surviving species of its genus Carcharodon, and is responsible for more recorded human bite incidents than any other shark.

The species faces numerous ecological challenges which has resulted in international protection. The International Union for Conservation of Nature lists the great white shark as a vulnerable species, and it is included in Appendix II of CITES. It is also protected by several national governments, such as Australia (as of 2018). Due to their need to travel long distances for seasonal migration and extremely demanding diet, it is not logistically feasible to keep great white sharks in captivity; because of this, while attempts have been made to do so in the past, there are no known aquariums in the world believed to house a live specimen.

The novel Jaws by Peter Benchley and its subsequent film adaptation by Steven Spielberg depicted the great white shark as a ferocious man-eater. Humans are not a preferred prey of the great white shark, but the great white is nevertheless responsible for the largest number of reported and identified fatal unprovoked shark attacks on humans, although this happens very rarely (typically fewer than 10 times a year globally).

Taxonomy
The great white is the sole recognized extant species in the genus Carcharodon, and is one of five extant species belonging to the family Lamnidae. Other members of this family include the mako sharks, porbeagle, and salmon shark. The family belongs to the Lamniformes, the order of mackerel sharks.

Etymology and naming history

The English name 'white shark' and its Australian variant 'white pointer' is thought to have come from the shark's stark white underside, a characteristic feature most noticeable in beached sharks lying upside down with their bellies exposed. Colloquial use favours the name 'great white shark', with 'great' perhaps stressing the size and prowess of the species, and "white shark" having historically been used to describe the much smaller oceanic white-tipped shark, later referred to for a time as the "lesser white shark". Most scientists prefer 'white shark', as the name "lesser white shark" is no longer used, while some use 'white shark' to refer to all members of the Lamnidae.

The scientific genus name Carcharodon literally means "jagged tooth", a reference to the large serrations that appear in the shark's teeth. It is a portmanteau of two Ancient Greek words: the prefix carchar- is derived from καρχαρίας (kárkharos), which means "jagged" or "sharp". The specific name carcharias is a Latinization of καρχαρίας (karkharías), the Ancient Greek word for shark.
The great white shark was one of the species originally described by Carl Linnaeus in his 1758 10th edition of Systema Naturae, in which it was identified as an amphibian and assigned the scientific name Squalus carcharias, Squalus being the genus that he placed all sharks in. By the 1810s, it was recognized that the shark should be placed in a new genus, but it was not until 1838 when Sir Andrew Smith coined the name Carcharodon as the new genus.

There have been a few attempts to describe and classify the great white before Linnaeus. One of its earliest mentions in literature as a distinct type of animal appears in Pierre Belon's 1553 book De aquatilibus duo, cum eiconibus ad vivam ipsorum effigiem quoad ejus fieri potuit, ad amplissimum cardinalem Castilioneum. In it, he illustrated and described the shark under the name Canis carcharias based on the jagged nature of its teeth and its alleged similarities with dogs. Another name used for the great white around this time was Lamia, first coined by Guillaume Rondelet in his 1554 book Libri de Piscibus Marinis, who also identified it as the fish that swallowed the prophet Jonah in biblical texts. Linnaeus recognized both names as previous classifications.

Fossil ancestry

Molecular clock studies published between 1988 and 2002 determined the closest living relative of the great white to be the mako sharks of the genus Isurus, which diverged some time between 60 to 43 million years ago. Tracing this evolutionary relationship through fossil evidence, however, remains subject to further paleontological study.

The original hypothesis of the great white shark's origin held that it is a descendant of a lineage of mega-toothed sharks, and is closely related to the prehistoric megalodon. Similarities between the teeth of great white and mega-toothed sharks, such as large triangular shapes, serrated blades, and the presence of dental bands, led the primary evidence of a close evolutionary relationship. As a result, scientists classified the ancient forms under the genus Carcharodon. Although weaknesses in the hypothesis existed, such as uncertainty over exactly which species evolved into the modern great white and multiple gaps in the fossil record, paleontologists were able to chart the hypothetical lineage back to a 60-million-year-old shark known as Cretalamna as the common ancestor of all sharks within the Lamnidae.

However, it is now understood that the great white shark holds closer ties to the mako sharks and is descended from a separate lineage as a chronospecies unrelated to the mega-toothed sharks. This was proven with the discovery of a transitional species that connected the great white to an unserrated shark known as Carcharodon hastalis. This transitional species, which was named Carcharodon hubbelli in 2012, demonstrated a mosaic of evolutionary transitions between the great white and C. hastalis, namely the gradual appearance of serrations, in a span of between 8 to 5 million years ago. The progression of C. hubbelli characterized shifting diets and niches; by 6.5 million years ago, the serrations were developed enough for C. hubbelli to handle marine mammals. Although both the great white and C. hastalis were known worldwide, C. hubbelli is primarily found in California, Peru, Chile, and surrounding coastal deposits, indicating that the great white had Pacific origins. C. hastalis continued to thrive alongside the great white until its last appearance around one million years ago and is believed to have possibly sired a number of additional species, including Carcharodon subserratus and Carcharodon plicatilis.

However, Yun argued that the tooth fossil remains of C. hastalis and Great White Shark "have been documented from the same deposits, hence the former cannot be a chronospecific ancestor of the latter." He also criticized that the C. hastalis "morphotype has never been tested through phylogenetic analyses," and denoted that as of 2021, the argument that the modern Carcharodon lineage with narrow, serrated teeth evolved from C. hastalis with a broad, unserrated teeth is uncertain.

Tracing beyond C. hastalis, another prevailing hypothesis proposes that the great white and mako lineages shared a common ancestor in a primitive mako-like species. The identity of this ancestor is still debated, but a potential species includes Isurolamna inflata, which lived between 65 to 55 million years ago. It is hypothesized that the great white and mako lineages split with the rise of two separate descendants, the one representing the great white shark lineage being Macrorhizodus praecursor.

Distribution and habitat 

One of the densest-known populations is found around Dyer Island, South Africa. Increased observation of young sharks in areas they were not previously common, such as Monterey Bay on the Central California coast, suggest climate change may be reducing the range of juvenile great white sharks and shifting it toward the poles.

The great white is an epipelagic fish, observed mostly in the presence of rich game, such as fur seals (Arctocephalus ssp.), sea lions, cetaceans, other sharks, and large bony fish species. These findings challenge the traditional notion that the great white is a coastal species.

According to a recent study, California great whites have migrated to an area between Baja California Peninsula and Hawaii known as the White Shark Café to spend at least 100 days before migrating back to Baja. Another white shark that was tagged off the South African coast swam to the southern coast of Australia and back within the year.
These observations argue against traditional theories that white sharks are coastal territorial predators, and open up the possibility of interaction between shark populations that were previously thought to have been discrete. The reasons for their migration and what they do at their destination is still unknown. Possibilities include seasonal feeding or mating.

In the Northwest Atlantic, the white shark populations off the New England coast were nearly eradicated due to over-fishing. In recent years, the populations have grown greatly, largely due to the increase in seal populations on Cape Cod, Massachusetts since the enactment of the Marine Mammal Protection Act in 1972. Currently very little is known about the hunting and movement patterns of great whites off Cape Cod, but ongoing studies hope to offer insight into this growing shark population. The Massachusetts Division of Marine Fisheries (part of the Department of Fish and Game) began a population study in 2014; since 2019, this research has focused on how humans can avoid conflict with sharks.

A 2018 study indicated that white sharks prefer to congregate deep in anticyclonic eddies in the North Atlantic Ocean. The sharks studied tended to favour the warm-water eddies, spending the daytime hours at 450 meters and coming to the surface at night.

Anatomy and appearance 

The great white shark has a robust, large, conical snout. The upper and lower lobes on the tail fin are approximately the same size which is similar to some mackerel sharks. A great white displays countershading, by having a white underside and a grey dorsal area (sometimes in a brown or blue shade) that gives an overall mottled appearance. The coloration makes it difficult for prey to spot the shark because it breaks up the shark's outline when seen from the side. From above, the darker shade blends with the sea and from below it exposes a minimal silhouette against the sunlight. Leucism is extremely rare in this species, but has been documented in one great white shark (a pup that washed ashore in Australia and died). Great white sharks, like many other sharks, have rows of serrated teeth behind the main ones, ready to replace any that break off. When the shark bites, it shakes its head side-to-side, helping the teeth saw off large chunks of flesh. Great white sharks, like other mackerel sharks, have larger eyes than other shark species in proportion to their body size. The iris of the eye is a deep blue instead of black.

Size 

In great white sharks, sexual dimorphism is present, and females are generally larger than males. Male great whites on average measure  in length, while females measure . The maximum size is subject to debate because some reports are rough estimations or speculations performed under questionable circumstances. Among living cartilaginous fish, only the whale shark (Rhincodon typus), the basking shark (Cetorhinus maximus) and the giant manta ray (Manta birostris), in that order, are on average larger and heavier. These three species are generally quite docile in disposition and given to passively filter-feeding on very small organisms. This makes the great white shark the largest extant macropredatory fish. Great white sharks measure approximately  when born, and grow about  every year.

A complete female great white shark specimen in the Museum of Zoology in Lausanne, and claimed by De Maddalena et al. According to J. E. Randall, the largest white shark reliably measured was a  specimen reported from Ledge Point, Western Australia in 1987, but it is unclear whether that length was measured with the caudal fin in its depressed or natural position. Another great white specimen of similar size was a female caught in August 1988 in the Gulf of St. Lawrence, off Prince Edward Island, by David McKendrick of Alberton, Prince Edward Island.

The largest great white recognized by the International Game Fish Association (IGFA) is one caught by Alf Dean in southern Australian waters in 1959, weighing .

Examples of large unconfirmed great whites 
A number of very large unconfirmed great white shark specimens have been recorded. For decades, many ichthyological works, as well as the Guinness Book of World Records, listed two great white sharks as the largest individuals: In the 1870s, a  great white captured in southern Australian waters, near Port Fairy, and an  shark trapped in a herring weir in New Brunswick, Canada, in the 1930s. However, these measurements were not obtained in a rigorous, scientifically valid manner, and researchers have questioned the reliability of these measurements for a long time, noting they were much larger than any other accurately reported sighting. Later studies proved these doubts to be well-founded. This New Brunswick shark may have been a misidentified basking shark, as the two have similar body shapes.

However, J. E. Randall believed that great white shark may have exceeded  in length. A great white shark was captured near Kangaroo Island in Australia on 1 April 1987. Another great white shark was caught in Malta by Alfredo Cutajar on 16 April 1987. However, photographic evidence suggested that these specimens were larger than the size estimations yielded through Randall's methods. Thus, a team of scientists—H. F. Mollet, G. M. Cailliet, A. P. Klimley, D. A. Ebert, A. D. Testi, and L. J. V. Compagno—reviewed the cases of the KANGA and MALTA specimens in 1996 to resolve the dispute by conducting a comprehensive morphometric analysis of the remains of these sharks and re-examination of photographic evidence in an attempt to validate the original size estimations and their findings were consistent with them. The findings indicated that estimations by P. Resiley and J. Abela are reasonable and could not be ruled out. Deep Blue would also later gain significant attention when she was filmed interacting with researcher Mauricio Hoyas Pallida in a viral video that Mauricio posted on Facebook on 11 June 2015. Deep Blue was later seen off Oahu in January 2019 while scavenging a sperm whale carcass, whereupon she was filmed swimming beside divers including dive tourism operator and model Ocean Ramsey in open water. A particularly infamous great white shark, supposedly of record proportions, once patrolled the area that comprises False Bay, South Africa, was said to be well over  during the early 1980s. This shark, known locally as the "Submarine", had a legendary reputation that was supposedly well-founded. Though rumours have stated this shark was exaggerated in size or non-existent altogether, witness accounts by the then young Craig Anthony Ferreira, a notable shark expert in South Africa, and his father indicate an unusually large animal of considerable size and power (though it remains uncertain just how massive the shark was as it escaped capture each time it was hooked). Ferreira describes the four encounters with the giant shark he participated in with great detail in his book "Great White Sharks On Their Best Behavior".

One contender in maximum size among the predatory sharks is the tiger shark (Galeocerdo cuvier). Some other macropredatory sharks such as the Greenland shark (Somniosus microcephalus) and the Pacific sleeper shark (S. pacificus) are also reported to rival these sharks in length (but probably weigh a bit less since they are more slender in build than a great white) in exceptional cases.

Reported sizes

Adaptations 

Great white sharks, like all other sharks, have an extra sense given by the ampullae of Lorenzini which enables them to detect the electromagnetic field emitted by the movement of living animals. Great whites are so sensitive they can detect variations of half a billionth of a volt. At close range, this allows the shark to locate even immobile animals by detecting their heartbeat. Most fish have a less-developed but similar sense using their body's lateral line.

To more successfully hunt fast and agile prey such as sea lions, the great white has adapted to maintain a body temperature warmer than the surrounding water. One of these adaptations is a "rete mirabile" (Latin for "wonderful net"). This close web-like structure of veins and arteries, located along each lateral side of the shark, conserves heat by warming the cooler arterial blood with the venous blood that has been warmed by the working muscles. When conserving energy, the core body temperature can drop to match the surroundings. A great white shark's success in raising its core temperature is an example of gigantothermy. Therefore, the great white shark can be considered an endothermic poikilotherm or mesotherm because its body temperature is not constant but is internally regulated. Great whites also rely on the fat and oils stored within their livers for long-distance migrations across nutrient-poor areas of the oceans. Studies by Stanford University and the Monterey Bay Aquarium published on 17 July 2013 revealed that in addition to controlling the sharks' buoyancy, the liver of great whites is essential in migration patterns. Sharks that sink faster during drift dives were revealed to use up their internal stores of energy quicker than those which sink in a dive at more leisurely rates.

Toxicity from heavy metals seems to have little negative effects on great white sharks. Blood samples taken from forty-three individuals of varying size, age and sex off the South African coast led by biologists from the University of Miami in 2012 indicates that despite high levels of mercury, lead, and arsenic, there was no sign of raised white blood cell count and granulate to lymphocyte ratios, indicating the sharks had healthy immune systems. This discovery suggests a previously unknown physiological defence against heavy metal poisoning. Great whites are known to have a propensity for "self-healing and avoiding age-related ailments".

Bite force 
A 2007 study from the University of New South Wales in Sydney, Australia, used CT scans of a shark's skull and computer models to measure the shark's maximum bite force. The study reveals the forces and behaviours its skull is adapted to handle and resolves competing theories about its feeding behaviour.

Ecology and behaviour 

This shark's behaviour and social structure are complex. In South Africa, white sharks have a dominance hierarchy depending on the size, sex and squatter's rights: Females dominate males, larger sharks dominate smaller sharks, and residents dominate newcomers. When hunting, great whites tend to separate and resolve conflicts with rituals and displays. White sharks rarely resort to combat although some individuals have been found with bite marks that match those of other white sharks. This suggests that when a great white approaches too closely to another, they react with a warning bite. Another possibility is that white sharks bite to show their dominance. Data acquired from animal-borne telemetry receivers and published in 2022 via the journal Royal Society Publishing suggests that individual great whites may associate so that they can inadvertently share information on the whereabouts of prey or the location of the remains of animals that can be scavenged. As biologging can help to reveal social habits, it allows a better understanding to be made in future studies regarding the full extent of social interactions in large marine animals, including the great white shark.

The great white shark is one of only a few sharks known to regularly lift its head above the sea surface to gaze at other objects such as prey. This is known as spy-hopping. This behaviour has also been seen in at least one group of blacktip reef sharks, but this might be learned from interaction with humans (it is theorized that the shark may also be able to smell better this way because smell travels through air faster than through water). White sharks are generally very curious animals, display intelligence and may also turn to socializing if the situation demands it. At Seal Island, white sharks have been observed arriving and departing in stable "clans" of two to six individuals on a yearly basis. Whether clan members are related is unknown, but they get along peacefully enough. In fact, the social structure of a clan is probably most aptly compared to that of a wolf pack, in that each member has a clearly established rank and each clan has an alpha leader. When members of different clans meet, they establish social rank nonviolently through any of a variety of interactions. In 2022, research in South Africa suggested that the great white shark has the ability to change colours to camouflage itself depending on the hormones it gives off. Different hormones would change the colour of the skin from white to grey. Skin dosed with adrenaline would turn lighter, with melanocyte-stimulating hormone causing melanocyte cells to dissipate thus making the shark's skin a darker colour, although hormone mediated color change is not fully validated due to the limited number of test subjects (i.e. great whites). The camo shark hypothesis is supported by the fact that zebra sharks can change their colour as they age, and rainbow sharks can lose colour due to stress and aging.

Diet 

Great white sharks are carnivorous and prey upon fish (e.g. tuna, rays, other sharks), cetaceans (i.e., dolphins, porpoises, whales), pinnipeds (e.g. seals, fur seals, and sea lions), sea turtles, sea otters (Enhydra lutris) and seabirds. Great whites have also been known to eat objects that they are unable to digest. They seem to be highly opportunistic. These sharks prefer prey with a high content of energy-rich fat. Shark expert Peter Klimley used a rod-and-reel rig and trolled carcasses of a seal, a pig, and a sheep from his boat in the South Farallons. The sharks attacked all three baits but rejected the sheep carcass.

Off Seal Island, False Bay in South Africa, the sharks ambush brown fur seals (Arctocephalus pusillus) from below at high speeds, hitting the seal mid-body. They achieve high speeds that allow them to completely breach the surface of the water. The peak burst speed is estimated to be above . They have also been observed chasing prey after a missed attack. Prey is usually attacked at the surface. Shark attacks occur most often in the morning, within two hours of sunrise, when visibility is poor. Their success rate is 55% in the first two hours, falling to 40% in late morning after which hunting stops.

Off California, sharks immobilize northern elephant seals (Mirounga angustirostris) with a large bite to the hindquarters (which is the main source of the seal's mobility) and wait for the seal to bleed to death. Most commonly though, juvenile elephant seals are the most frequently eaten at elephant seal colonies. Prey is normally attacked sub-surface. Harbor seals (Phoca vitulina) are taken from the surface and dragged down until they stop struggling. They are then eaten near the bottom. California sea lions (Zalophus californianus) are ambushed from below and struck mid-body before being dragged and eaten.

In the Northwest Atlantic mature great whites are known to feed on both harbor and grey seals. Unlike adults, juvenile white sharks in the area feed on smaller fish species until they are large enough to prey on marine mammals such as seals.

White sharks also attack dolphins and porpoises from above, behind or below to avoid being detected by their echolocation. Targeted species include dusky dolphins (Sagmatias obscurus), Risso's dolphins (Grampus griseus), bottlenose dolphins (Tursiops ssp.), humpback dolphins (Sousa ssp.), harbour porpoises (Phocoena phocoena), and Dall's porpoises (Phocoenoides dalli). Groups of dolphins have occasionally been observed defending themselves from sharks with mobbing behaviour. White shark predation on other species of small cetacean has also been observed. In August 1989, a  juvenile male pygmy sperm whale (Kogia breviceps) was found stranded in central California with a bite mark on its caudal peduncle from a great white shark. In addition, white sharks attack and prey upon beaked whales. When hunting sea turtles, they appear to simply bite through the carapace around a flipper, immobilizing the turtle. The heaviest species of bony fish, the oceanic sunfish (Mola mola), has been found in great white shark stomachs.

Whale carcasses comprise an important part of the diet of white sharks. However, this has rarely been observed due to whales dying in remote areas. It has been estimated that  of whale blubber could feed a  white shark for 1.5 months. Detailed observations were made of four whale carcasses in False Bay between 2000 and 2010. Sharks were drawn to the carcass by chemical and odour detection, spread by strong winds. After initially feeding on the whale caudal peduncle and fluke, the sharks would investigate the carcass by slowly swimming around it and mouthing several parts before selecting a blubber-rich area. During feeding bouts of 15–20 seconds the sharks removed flesh with lateral headshakes, without the protective ocular rotation they employ when attacking live prey. The sharks were frequently observed regurgitating chunks of blubber and immediately returning to feed, possibly in order to replace low energy yield pieces with high energy yield pieces, using their teeth as mechanoreceptors to distinguish them. After feeding for several hours, the sharks appeared to become lethargic, no longer swimming to the surface; they were observed mouthing the carcass but apparently unable to bite hard enough to remove flesh, they would instead bounce off and slowly sink. Up to eight sharks were observed feeding simultaneously, bumping into each other without showing any signs of aggression; on one occasion a shark accidentally bit the head of a neighbouring shark, leaving two teeth embedded, but both continued to feed unperturbed. Smaller individuals hovered around the carcass eating chunks that drifted away. Unusually for the area, large numbers of sharks over five metres long were observed, suggesting that the largest sharks change their behaviour to search for whales as they lose the manoeuvrability required to hunt seals. The investigating team concluded that the importance of whale carcasses, particularly for the largest white sharks, has been underestimated.

In another documented incident, white sharks were observed scavenging on a whale carcass alongside tiger sharks. In 2020, marine biologists Sasha Dines and Enrico Gennari published a documented incident in the journal Marine and Freshwater Research of a group of great white sharks exhibiting pack-like behaviour, successfully attacking and killing a live juvenile 7 m (23 ft) humpback whale. The sharks utilized the classic attack strategy used on pinnipeds when attacking the whale, even utilizing the bite-and-spit tactic they employ on smaller prey items. The whale was an entangled individual, heavily emaciated and thus more vulnerable to the sharks' attacks. The incident is the first known documentation of great whites actively killing a large baleen whale. A second incident regarding great white sharks killing humpback whales involving a single large female great white nicknamed Helen was documented off the coast of South Africa. Working alone, the shark attacked a  emaciated and entangled humpback whale by attacking the whale's tail to cripple it before she managed to drown the whale by biting onto its head and pulling it underwater. The attack was witnessed via aerial drone by marine biologist Ryan Johnson, who said the attack went on for roughly 50 minutes before the shark successfully killed the whale. Johnson suggested that the shark may have strategized its attack in order to kill such a large animal.

Stomach contents of great whites also indicates that whale sharks both juvenile and adult may also be included on the animal's menu, though whether this is active hunting or scavenging is not known at present.

Reproduction 
Great white sharks were previously thought to reach sexual maturity at around 15 years of age, but are now believed to take far longer; male great white sharks reach sexual maturity at age 26, while females take 33 years to reach sexual maturity. Maximum life span was originally believed to be more than 30 years, but a study by the Woods Hole Oceanographic Institution placed it at upwards of 70 years. Examinations of vertebral growth ring count gave a maximum male age of 73 years and a maximum female age of 40 years for the specimens studied. The shark's late sexual maturity, low reproductive rate, long gestation period of 11 months and slow growth make it vulnerable to pressures such as overfishing and environmental change.

Little is known about the great white shark's mating habits, and mating behaviour had not been observed in this species until 1997 and properly documented in 2020. It was assumed previously to be possible that whale carcasses are an important location for sexually mature sharks to meet for mating. According to the testimony of fisherman Dick Ledgerwood, who observed two great white sharks mating in the area near Port Chalmers and Otago Harbor, in New Zealand, it is theorized that great white sharks mate in shallow water away from feeding areas and continually roll belly to belly during copulation. Birth has never been observed, but pregnant females have been examined. Great white sharks are ovoviviparous, which means eggs develop and hatch in the uterus and continue to develop until birth. The great white has an 11-month gestation period. The shark pup's powerful jaws begin to develop in the first month. The unborn sharks participate in oophagy, in which they feed on ova produced by the mother. Delivery is in spring and summer. The largest number of pups recorded for this species is 14 pups from a single mother measuring  that was killed incidentally off Taiwan in 2019.

Breaching behaviour 

A breach is the result of a high-speed approach to the surface with the resulting momentum taking the shark partially or completely clear of the water. This is a hunting technique employed by great white sharks whilst hunting seals. This technique is often used on cape fur seals at Seal Island in False Bay, South Africa. Because the behaviour is unpredictable, it is very hard to document. It was first photographed by Chris Fallows and Rob Lawrence who developed the technique of towing a slow-moving seal decoy to trick the sharks to breach. Between April and September, scientists may observe around 600 breaches. The seals swim on the surface and the great white sharks launch their predatory attack from the deeper water below. Just under half of observed breach attacks are successful. In 2011, a 3-m-long shark jumped onto a seven-person research vessel off Seal Island in Mossel Bay. The crew were undertaking a population study using sardines as bait, and the incident was judged not to be an attack on the boat but an accident.

Natural threats 

Interspecific competition between the great white shark and the orca is probable in regions where dietary preferences of both species may overlap. An incident was documented on 4 October 1997, in the Farallon Islands off California in the United States. An estimated  female orca immobilized an estimated  great white shark. The orca held the shark upside down to induce tonic immobility and kept the shark still for fifteen minutes, causing it to suffocate. The orca then proceeded to eat the dead shark's liver. It is believed that the scent of the slain shark's carcass caused all the great whites in the region to flee, forfeiting an opportunity for a great seasonal feed. Another similar attack apparently occurred there in 2000, but its outcome is not clear. After both attacks, the local population of about 100 great whites vanished.

In 2015, a pod of orcas was recorded to have killed a great white shark off South Australia. In 2017, three great whites were found washed ashore near Gansbaai, South Africa, with their body cavities torn open and the livers removed by what is likely to have been orcas. Orcas also generally impact great white distribution. Studies published in 2019 of orca and great white shark distribution and interactions around the Farallon Islands indicate that the cetaceans impact the sharks negatively, with brief appearances by orcas causing the sharks to seek out new feeding areas until the next season. It is unclear whether this is an example of competitive exclusion or ecology of fear. Occasionally, however, some great whites have been seen to swim near orcas without fear.

Relationship with humans

Shark bite incidents 

Of all shark species, the great white shark is responsible for by far the largest number of recorded shark bite incidents on humans, with 272 documented unprovoked bite incidents on humans as of 2012.

More than any documented bite incident, Peter Benchley's best-selling novel Jaws and the subsequent 1975 film adaptation directed by Steven Spielberg provided the great white shark with the image of being a "man-eater" in the public mind. While great white sharks have killed humans in at least 74 documented unprovoked bite incidents, they typically do not target them: for example, in the Mediterranean Sea there have been 31 confirmed bite incidents against humans in the last two centuries, most of which were non-fatal. Many of the incidents seemed to be "test-bites". Great white sharks also test-bite buoys, flotsam, and other unfamiliar objects, and they might grab a human or a surfboard to identify what it is.

Contrary to popular belief, great white sharks do not mistake humans for seals. Many bite incidents occur in waters with low visibility or other situations which impair the shark's senses. The species appears to not like the taste of humans, or at least finds the taste unfamiliar. Further research shows that they can tell in one bite whether or not the object is worth predating upon. Humans, for the most part, are too bony for their liking. They much prefer seals, which are fat and rich in protein.

Studies published in 2021 by Ryan et al. in the Journal of the Royal Society Interface suggest that mistaken identity is in fact a case for many shark bite incidents perpetrated by great white sharks. Using cameras and footage of seals in aquariums as models and mounted cameras moving at the same speed and angle as a cruising great white shark looking up at the surface from below, the experiment suggests that the sharks are likely colorblind and cannot see in fine enough detail to determine whether the silhouette above them is a pinniped or a swimming human, potentially vindicating the hypothesis.

Humans are not appropriate prey because the shark's digestion is too slow to cope with a human's high ratio of bone to muscle and fat. Accordingly, in most recorded shark bite incidents, great whites broke off contact after the first bite. Fatalities are usually caused by blood loss from the initial bite rather than from critical organ loss or from whole consumption. From 1990 to 2011 there have been a total of 139 unprovoked great white shark bite incidents, 29 of which were fatal.

However, some researchers have hypothesized that the reason the proportion of fatalities is low is not that sharks do not like human flesh, but because humans are often able to escape after the first bite. In the 1980s, John McCosker, chair of aquatic biology at the California Academy of Sciences, noted that divers who dived solo and were bitten by great whites were generally at least partially consumed, while divers who followed the buddy system were generally rescued by their companion. McCosker and Timothy C. Tricas, an author and professor at the University of Hawaii, suggest that a standard pattern for great whites is to make an initial devastating attack and then wait for the prey to weaken before consuming the wounded animal. Humans' ability to move out of reach with the help of others, thus foiling the attack, is unusual for a great white's prey.

Shark culling 

Shark culling is the deliberate killing of sharks by a government in an attempt to reduce shark attacks; shark culling is often called "shark control". These programs have been criticized by environmentalists and scientists—they say these programs harm the marine ecosystem; they also say such programs are "outdated, cruel, and ineffective". Many different species (dolphins, turtles, etc.) are also killed in these programs (because of their use of shark nets and drum lines)—15,135 marine animals were killed in New South Wales' nets between 1950 and 2008, and 84,000 marine animals were killed by Queensland authorities from 1962 to 2015.

Great white sharks are currently killed in both Queensland and New South Wales in "shark control" (shark culling) programs. Queensland uses shark nets and drum lines with baited hooks, while New South Wales only uses nets. From 1962 to 2018, Queensland authorities killed about 50,000 sharks, many of which were great whites. From 2013 to 2014 alone, 667 sharks were killed by Queensland authorities, including great white sharks. In Queensland, great white sharks found alive on the drum lines are shot. In New South Wales, between 1950 and 2008, a total of 577 great white sharks were killed in nets. Between September 2017 and April 2018, fourteen great white sharks were killed in New South Wales.

KwaZulu-Natal (an area of South Africa) also has a "shark control" program that kills great white sharks and other marine life. In a 30-year period, more than 33,000 sharks were killed in KwaZulu-Natal's shark-killing program, including great whites.

In 2014 the state government of Western Australia led by Premier Colin Barnett implemented a policy of killing large sharks. The policy, colloquially referred to as the Western Australian shark cull, was intended to protect users of the marine environment from shark bite incidents, following the deaths of seven people on the Western Australian coastline in the years 2010–2013. Baited drum lines were deployed near popular beaches using hooks designed to catch great white sharks, as well as bull and tiger sharks. Large sharks found hooked but still alive were shot and their bodies discarded at sea. The government claimed they were not culling the sharks, but were using a "targeted, localised, hazard mitigation strategy". Barnett described opposition as "ludicrous" and "extreme", and said that nothing could change his mind. This policy was met with widespread condemnation from the scientific community, which showed that species responsible for bite incidents were notoriously hard to identify, that the drum lines failed to capture white sharks, as intended, and that the government also failed to show any correlation between their drum line policy and a decrease in shark bite incidents in the region.

Attacks on boats 
Great white sharks infrequently bite and sometimes even sink boats. Only five of the 108 authenticated unprovoked shark bite incidents reported from the Pacific Coast during the 20th century involved kayakers. They have bumped or knocked people overboard, usually biting the boat from the stern. In one case in 1936, a large shark leapt completely into the South African fishing boat Lucky Jim, knocking a crewman into the sea. Tricas and McCosker's underwater observations suggest that sharks are attracted to boats by the electrical fields they generate, which are picked up by the ampullae of Lorenzini and confuse the shark about whether or not wounded prey might be nearby.

In captivity 

Prior to August 1981, no great white shark in captivity lived longer than 11 days. In August 1981, a great white survived for 16 days at SeaWorld San Diego before being released. The idea of containing a live great white at SeaWorld Orlando was used in the 1983 film Jaws 3-D.

Monterey Bay Aquarium first attempted to display a great white in 1984, but the shark died after 11 days because it did not eat. In July 2003, Monterey researchers captured a small female and kept it in a large netted pen near Malibu for five days. They had the rare success of getting the shark to feed in captivity before its release. Not until September 2004 was the aquarium able to place a great white on long-term exhibit. A young female, which was caught off the coast of Ventura, was kept in the aquarium's  Outer Bay exhibit for 198 days before she was released in March 2005. She was tracked for 30 days after release. On the evening of 31 August 2006, the aquarium introduced a juvenile male caught outside Santa Monica Bay. He was released on 16 January 2007, after 137 days in captivity.

Monterey Bay Aquarium housed a third great white, a juvenile male, for 162 days between 27 August 2007, and 5 February 2008. A juvenile female came to the Outer Bay Exhibit on 27 August 2008. While she did swim well, the shark fed only once during her stay and was tagged and released on 7 September 2008. Another juvenile female was captured near Malibu on 12 August 2009, introduced to the Outer Bay exhibit on 26 August 2009, and was successfully released into the wild on 4 November 2009. The Monterey Bay Aquarium introduced a 1.4-m-long male into their redesigned "Open Sea" exhibit on 31 August 2011. He was exhibited for 55 days, and was released into the wild on the 25th of October the same year. However, the shark was determined to have died shortly after release via an attached electronic tag. The cause of death is not known.

The Monterey Bay Aquarium does not plan to exhibit any more great whites, as the main purpose of containing them was scientific. As data from captive great whites were no longer needed, the institute has instead shifted its focus to study wild sharks.

One of the largest adult great whites ever exhibited was at Japan's Okinawa Churaumi Aquarium in 2016, where a  male was exhibited for three days before dying. Perhaps the most famous captive was a  female named Sandy, which in August 1980 became the only great white to be housed at the California Academy of Sciences' Steinhart Aquarium in San Francisco, California. She was released because she would not eat and constantly bumped against the walls.

Due to the vast amounts of resources required and the subsequent cost to keep a great white shark alive in captivity, their dietary preferences, size, migratory nature, and the stress of capture and containment, permanent exhibition of a great white shark is likely to be unfeasible.

Shark tourism 
Cage diving is most common at sites where great whites are frequent including the coast of South Africa, the Neptune Islands in South Australia, and Guadalupe Island in Baja California. The popularity of cage diving and swimming with sharks is at the focus of a booming tourist industry. A common practice is to chum the water with pieces of fish to attract the sharks. These practices may make sharks more accustomed to people in their environment and to associate human activity with food; a potentially dangerous situation. By drawing bait on a wire towards the cage, tour operators lure the shark to the cage, possibly striking it, exacerbating this problem. Other operators draw the bait away from the cage, causing the shark to swim past the divers.

At present, hang baits are illegal off Isla Guadalupe and reputable dive operators do not use them. Operators in South Africa and Australia continue to use hang baits and pinniped decoys. In South Australia, playing rock music recordings underwater, including the AC/DC album Back in Black has also been used experimentally to attract sharks.

Companies object to being blamed for shark bite incidents, pointing out that lightning tends to strike humans more often than sharks bite humans. Their position is that further research needs to be done before banning practices such as chumming, which may alter natural behaviour. One compromise is to only use chum in areas where whites actively patrol anyway, well away from human leisure areas. Also, responsible dive operators do not feed sharks. Only sharks that are willing to scavenge follow the chum trail and if they find no food at the end then the shark soon swims off and does not associate chum with a meal. It has been suggested that government licensing strategies may help enforce these responsible tourism.

Conservation status 
It is unclear how much of a concurrent increase in fishing for great white sharks has caused the decline of great white shark populations from the 1970s to the present. No accurate global population numbers are available, but the great white shark is now considered vulnerable. Sharks taken during the long interval between birth and sexual maturity never reproduce, making population recovery and growth difficult.

The International Union for Conservation of Nature notes that very little is known about the actual status of the great white shark, but as it appears uncommon compared to other widely distributed species, it is considered vulnerable. It is included in Appendix II of CITES, meaning that international trade in the species (including parts and derivatives) requires a permit. As of March 2010, it has also been included in Annex I of the CMS Migratory Sharks MoU, which strives for increased international understanding and coordination for the protection of certain migratory sharks. A February 2010 study by Barbara Block of Stanford University estimated the world population of great white sharks to be lower than 3,500 individuals, making the species more vulnerable to extinction than the tiger, whose population is in the same range. According to another study from 2014 by George H. Burgess, Florida Museum of Natural History, University of Florida, there are about 2,000 great white sharks near the California coast, which is 10 times higher than the previous estimate of 219 by Barbara Block.

Fishermen target many sharks for their jaws, teeth, and fins, and as game fish in general. The great white shark, however, is rarely an object of commercial fishing, although its flesh is considered valuable. If casually captured (it happens for example in some tonnare in the Mediterranean), it is misleadingly sold as smooth-hound shark.

In Australia 
The great white shark was declared vulnerable by the Australian Government in 1999 because of significant population decline and is currently protected under the Environmental Protection and Biodiversity Conservation (EPBC) Act. The causes of decline prior to protection included mortality from sport fishing harvests as well as being caught in beach protection netting.

The national conservation status of the great white shark is reflected by all Australian states under their respective laws, granting the species full protection throughout Australia regardless of jurisdiction. Many states had prohibited the killing or possession of great white sharks prior to national legislation coming into effect. The great white shark is further listed as threatened in Victoria under the Flora and Fauna Guarantee Act, and as rare or likely to become extinct under Schedule 5 of the Wildlife Conservation Act in Western Australia.

In 2002, the Australian government created the White Shark Recovery Plan, implementing government-mandated conservation research and monitoring for conservation in addition to federal protection and stronger regulation of shark-related trade and tourism activities. An updated recovery plan was published in 2013 to review progress, research findings, and to implement further conservation actions. A study in 2012 revealed that Australia's white shark population was separated by Bass Strait into genetically distinct eastern and western populations, indicating a need for the development of regional conservation strategies.

Presently, human-caused shark mortality is continuing, primarily from accidental and illegal catching in commercial and recreational fishing as well as from being caught in beach protection netting, and the populations of great white shark in Australia are yet to recover.

In spite of official protections in Australia, great white sharks continue to be killed in state "shark control" programs within Australia. For example, the government of Queensland has a "shark control" program (shark culling) which kills great white sharks (as well as other marine life) using shark nets and drum lines with baited hooks. In Queensland, great white sharks that are found alive on the baited hooks are shot. The government of New South Wales also kills great white sharks in its "shark control" program. Partly because of these programs, shark numbers in eastern Australia have decreased.

The Australasian population of great white sharks is believed to be in excess of 8,000–10,000 individuals according to genetic research studies done by CSIRO, with an adult population estimated to be around 2,210 individuals in both Eastern and Western Australia. The annual survival rate for juveniles in these two separate populations was estimated in the same study to be close to 73 percent, while adult sharks had a 93 percent annual survival rate. Whether or not mortality rates in great white sharks have declined, or the population has increased as a result of the protection of this species in Australian waters is as yet unknown due to the slow growth rates of this species.

In New Zealand 
As of April 2007, great white sharks were fully protected within  of New Zealand and additionally from fishing by New Zealand-flagged boats outside this range. The maximum penalty is a $250,000 fine and up to six months in prison. In June 2018 the New Zealand Department of Conservation classified the great white shark under the New Zealand Threat Classification System as "Nationally Endangered". The species meets the criteria for this classification as there exists a moderate, stable population of between 1000 and 5000 mature individuals. This classification has the qualifiers "Data Poor" and "Threatened Overseas".

In North America 
In 2013, great white sharks were added to California's Endangered Species Act. From data collected, the population of great whites in the North Pacific was estimated to be fewer than 340 individuals. Research also reveals these sharks are genetically distinct from other members of their species elsewhere in Africa, Australia, and the east coast of North America, having been isolated from other populations.

A 2014 study estimated the population of great white sharks along the California coastline to be approximately 2,400.

In 2015 Massachusetts banned catching, cage diving, feeding, towing decoys, or baiting and chumming for its significant and highly predictable migratory great white population without an appropriate research permit. The goal of these restrictions is to both protect the sharks and public health.

See also 

 List of sharks
 List of threatened sharks
 Outline of sharks
 Shark culling
 Western Australian shark cull

Books 
 The Devil's Teeth by Susan Casey
 Close to Shore by Michael Capuzzo about the Jersey Shore shark attacks of 1916
 Twelve Days of Terror by Richard Fernicola about the same events

Notes

References

External links 

 White Shark, NOAA Fisheries
 White Shark Information, California Department of Fish and Wildlife
 White Shark, Carcharodon carcharias (Linnaeus, 1758), Australian Museum
 Atlantic White Shark Conservancy
 White Shark Conservation Trust, New Zealand

Apex predators
Articles containing video clips
great white shark
Cosmopolitan fish
Extant Miocene first appearances
great white shark
Ovoviviparous fish
Scavengers
great white shark